Manuel Arturo Peña Batlle is a Santo Domingo Metro, Dominican Republic, station on Line 1. It was open on 22 January 2009 as part of the inaugural section of Line 1 between Mamá Tingó and Centro de los Héroes. The station is between Pedro Livio Cedeño and Juan Pablo Duarte.

This is an underground station, built below Avenida Máximo Gómez. It is named to honor Manuel Arturo Peña Batlle.

References

Santo Domingo Metro stations
2009 establishments in the Dominican Republic
Railway stations opened in 2009